Amaliegade 4 is a historic property located in the Frederiksstaden Quarter of central Copenhagen, Denmark. It was built for sugar manufacturer Christian Rønnenkamp in 1829 and was listed on the Danish Registry of Protected Buildings and Places in 1950.

History

St. Croix Sugar House

In the site was originally part of the large corner property (Sankt Annæ Plads 18). In the new   cadastre of 1756, the property was listed as No. 71 P. It was by then owned by Johan Just Bradt. On Christian Gedde's map of St. Ann's East Quarter, the property was marked as No. 323.

A sugar refinery known as St. Croix Sugar House was in approximately 1783 established at the site by Østersøisk-guineisk Handelsselskab. The sugar refinery was by 1787 managed by Niels Nielsen Hald. He lived in one of the apartments of the corner building with his five children (aged two to 14), a maid, three sugar refinery workers (svend)) and nine apprentices. Jeppe Prætorius was by 1787 among the residents.

The company was liquidated in 1787. The sugar refinery was continued by new owners but closed during the economic crisis of the war with England and the bombardment of Copenhagen in 1807.

Christian Rønnenkamp

The property was sold in public auction to Christian Rønnenkamp who already owned a sugar refinery in Dronningens Rværgade. He constructed the building at Amaliegade 4 in 1828-29 and moved his sugar business to the new site. He lived in the building at No. 4 but also used it as a retail outlet.

Later history
In 1835, Rønnenkamp purchased the estates of Næsbygård and Bavelse from the Danish government. He then sold his property in Copenhagen and the sugar refinery closed but at least in the beginning he seems to have experimented with cultivation of sugar beats on his new estates.

Count Carl von Moltke, who had lived at Sankt Annæ Plads 15 for the last nine years, moved to Amaliegade 4 in 1854 or 184 but soon thereafter continued to Amaliegade 17. Amaliegade 14 was then taken over by Frederik Marcus Knuth, Count of Knuthenborg, but he died on 8 January 1856. Former prime minister Christian Albrecht Bluhme lived at Amaliegade 4 in 1862–63.

N. Schiøtt & Hochbrandt, a shipping company, acquired the building in 1950 and made it their new headquarters.

Architecture
Amaliegade 4 consists of three storeys and a cellar and is five bays wide. A gateway on the right side of the building opens to a long, narrow courtyard. An 11-bay side wing (No. 4B) of the same age as the main wing extends along the north side of the courtyard. At the bottom of the courtyard is a four-bay rear wing (No. 4C) which dates from before1828. The entire complex was listed on the Danish Registry of Protected Buildings and Places in 1950.

Today
The building is now owned by E/F Amaliegade 4 and used as office space.

References

External links

 Source

Listed buildings and structures in Copenhagen
Residential buildings completed in 1755
Frederiksstaden
Sugar refineries in Copenhagen